Buses play a major role in the public transport of Malaysia, as well as seeing extensive private use. While rail transport has increased over the recent years due to road congestion, the same does not apply to buses, which have generally been used less in most of the area.

History

Regulation
Today, bus service provision for public transport in Malaysia is regulated by the Land Public Transport Agency (APAD).

Types in use

In Malaysia, the most common types of buses used are single-decker buses, double-decker buses, and midi buses. Single-decker buses, also known as city buses, are designed to operate within urban areas and are mostly used for short to medium-length journeys. Double-decker buses, on the other hand, are mainly used for longer journeys, such as intercity travel, and offer greater capacity with their upper decks. Midi buses, which are smaller than full-sized buses but larger than mini buses, are also commonly used in Malaysia. They are ideal for routes with lower passenger demand and narrow roads. In recent years, there has been a growing interest in eco-friendly public transportation, and Malaysia has been introducing electric buses and hybrid buses as well. As of 2021, the Malaysian government plans to launch a pilot program to introduce hydrogen fuel cell buses in Kuching, Sarawak. These buses produce zero-emission and are expected to improve air quality in urban areas.

Services
Aside from normal urban and inter-urban services, bus transport in Malaysia also has a number of niche uses:
 Express services
 Shuttle bus services, including airport bus (KLIA), university shuttles (UM, UPM and UKM), rail replacement bus service for Kelana Jaya Line and currently Ampang Line
 Employee bus services, which mostly painted in blue colour
 School bus services, which mostly painted in yellow colour
 Hail and Ride services
 Demand responsive transport (DRT) services such as Kumpool van pooling service
 Long-distance coach services
 Zero-fare services such as Go KL City Bus

Bus rapid transit systems

Bus Rapid Transit (BRT) is a high-capacity, high-frequency bus-based public transportation system that has gained popularity in many countries as a cost-effective alternative to traditional light rail systems. BRT systems typically have dedicated lanes, independent stations and high-capacity buses that provide a reliable and efficient service to commuters.

In Malaysia, BRT has become an alternative to light rail proposals due to cost considerations. Currently, only one BRT system in Malaysia, which is the BRT Sunway Line, which serves as a feeder service to the existing rail network in Klang Valley. Sunway BRT services the southeastern suburbs of Petaling Jaya, Selangor and is the  world's first all-electric system.

Other cities in Malaysia that have plan to implemented BRT systems include Johor Bahru, Kuching and Kota Kinabalu. The BRT system in Johor Bahru, also known as the Iskandar Malaysia BRT, is part of a larger public transportation network that also includes the RTS Link. It will consist of trunk, direct, and feeder bus rapid transit corridors. The BRT Kota Kinabalu and BRT Kuchingwere planned to provide a reliable and efficient service to commuters in the city centre in both cities.

Private uses

Private buses are commonly used in Malaysia for various purposes such as charter services, school transportation and company employee transportation. For example, charter bus Service is offered by Rapid Penang that provides reliable and affordable transportation options for schools, companies or anyone. The service charges are based on the duration of the service or mileage, ranging from RM 600 to RM 1600. Private buses are commonly used for holiday travel as well, with many companies offering tour packages that include transportation by private bus.

Private buses used for holiday travel in Malaysia are typically equipped with air conditioning, comfortable seating, and often have on-board entertainment systems. They are used for a variety of tours, including city tours, nature tours, and cultural tours. For example, Hop-On Hop-Off concept open top bus is available in Kuala Lumpur and Penang. Private buses can be rented for exclusive use by tour groups, providing flexibility and convenience to the group.

Operating companies
Bus services in Malaysia are primarily operated by private companies, with a few community-based or not-for-profit entities and local authority-affiliated companies also in operation.

Stage bus

The largest stage bus operator in Malaysia is the government-owned company Prasarana Malaysia Berhad, which operates a number of stage bus services under the subsidiary of Rapid Bus in several regions such as the Klang Valley, Greater Penang and Kuantan. Other major stage bus operators in Malaysia include Causeway Link (mainly in Johor Bahru), PerakTransit and Panorama Melaka. The federal government also has established the Interim Stage Bus Support Fund (ISBSF) to help cover the daily operating costs of other stage bus operators, especially in rural areas, who have incurred losses due to unprofitable routes. This initiative was created to ensure that small bus companies do not terminate their services and continue to operate in rural areas.

Express bus
Express bus services are one of the most convenient ways to travel across Malaysia, where there are over a hundred bus companies. These bus companies offer different routes, schedules, fares and booking procedures. Among these bus companies, several popular bus operators are preferred by both locals and tourists alike.

Transnasional, established in 2007, offers several routes throughout Malaysia, with a fleet of nearly 1,500 buses. The company offers coaches ranging from standard to business and executive class.
Mayang Sari Express was founded in 1993 and now has a fleet of over a hundred buses. They offer trips from Johor to Alor Setar and Johor to Pulau Pinang, among other routes. The company provides luxury coaches at competitive prices. KKKL Express began services in 1983.

These popular bus companies in Malaysia offer a range of services that cater to the needs of different passengers. They offer convenient and hassle-free booking, with several online booking options available. The coaches in their fleet are comfortable and equipped with modern amenities, ensuring that passengers enjoy a smooth and comfortable journey.

Manufacturers
Bus manufacturing in Malaysia is dominated by foreign companies with few domestic manufacturers. However, there have been some local players in the market, including DRB-HICOM Bhd, which manufactures buses through its subsidiary, HICOM Automotive Manufacturers (Malaysia) Sdn Bhd.

Foreign manufacturers such as Scania, Volvo and Mercedes-Benz are among the major players in Malaysia's bus manufacturing industry. Scania has been manufacturing buses in Malaysia since the 1970s and has a significant market share in the country. Volvo, through its Malaysian subsidiary, Volvo Malaysia Sdn Bhd, also manufactures buses locally.

There has been a push towards electric buses in Malaysia, with several companies, including Scania and Volvo, introducing electric bus models in the country.

Subsidies
In Malaysia, bus subsidies are an important part of the government's efforts to promote public transportation and reduce traffic congestion. One notable initiative is the My50 monthly bus pass, which allows unlimited travel on Rapid KL, MRT and BRT services for only RM50 per month. It was introduced by the Federal Government under the Penjana Economic Recovery Plan in June 2020 as the My30 unlimited travel pass until December 31, 2021. This has been a popular program in the Klang Valley and similar initiatives have been implemented in other states, such as Penang with the Mutiara Pass. Cross-strait bus service (which is known as CAT Bridge) also available to provide bus services between Penang Island and Seberang Perai, and operated at free during working days.

In addition to the unlimited pass program, there have been other subsidies and incentives aimed at encouraging the use of buses. Stage Bus Service Transformation (SBST) was established by the government in 2015. In these states, SBST aims to improve existing bus services by providing better routes, schedules and vehicles. The initiative also includes the introduction of cashless payment systems and the integration of bus services with other modes of public transportation. This program is active in Kangar, Seremban, Ipoh, Kuala Terengganu and Johor Bahru.

Smart Selangor bus service, which is a state-funded bus service funded by the Selangor state government. The service was launched in 2018 as part of the state government's efforts to improve public transportation and reduce traffic congestion in the region. The service is operated by private bus operators under contract with the state government and covers 12 cities and municipalities in Selangor, including Petaling Jaya, Shah Alam, Klang and Subang Jaya. The Smart Selangor bus service features a number of modern amenities and technologies aimed at improving the comfort and convenience of passengers. All buses are equipped with air-conditioning, free Wi-Fi, and GPS tracking systems, which allow passengers to track the location of their bus in real-time through a mobile app. In addition, the buses are wheelchair-accessible and equipped with CCTV cameras for enhanced security.

To encourage the use of public transportation, the Smart Selangor bus service offers affordable fares and various ticketing options, including cashless payment methods using CePAT apps for non-Malaysians, while Malaysians are excluded from paying the fares. The service also offers a variety of route options that connect to other modes of public transportation, such as rail and bus interchanges and also public amenities including government hospitals, schools and commercial area.

See also

 Transport in Malaysia

References

External links
 Bus Service page at Land Public Transport Agency (APAD) website